Kai Jølver (11 July 1889 – 24 July 1940) was a Danish modern pentathlete. He competed at the 1912 Summer Olympics.

References

External links
 

1889 births
1940 deaths
Danish male modern pentathletes
Olympic modern pentathletes of Denmark
Modern pentathletes at the 1912 Summer Olympics
People from Svendborg
Sportspeople from the Region of Southern Denmark